Eleutherodactylus parapelates is a species of frog in the family Eleutherodactylidae. It is endemic to the Massif de la Hotte in southwestern Haiti. Common names Casillon robber frog (sic — the type locality is spelled "Castillon") and Macaya burrowing frog have been proposed for it.

Description
Adult males measure on average  in snout–vent length and can reach ; females are unknown. The snout is protruding in profile. The canthus rostralis is well defined. The supra-tympanic fold is prominent and hides the upper edge of the tympanum. The fingers and toes have expanded tips; toes are unwebbed but fingers have indistinct lateral ridges. The dorsum is dark brown to pale brown, almost tan, and has darker spotting. There are black supra-tympanic markings.

Habitat and conservation
It is a fossorial species. Males call from shallow, underground chambers, and also the eggs are laid underground. However, one individual was found on herbaceous vegetation about 1 m above the ground. Calling males can be found quite close to each other (about 1 m apart).

Eleutherodactylus parapelates is threatened by habitat loss: its range is suffering from severe habitat destruction, primarily due to logging for charcoal production by local people and by slash-and-burn agriculture. Part of its range overlaps with the Pic Macaya National Park, but the park is not managed for conservation. It was formerly moderately common in suitable habitat but has now largely disappeared.

References

parapelates
Frogs of Haiti
Endemic fauna of Haiti
Amphibians described in 1987
Taxa named by Stephen Blair Hedges
Taxa named by Richard Thomas (herpetologist)
Taxonomy articles created by Polbot